The Stepenitz is a river in the district of Prignitz, Brandenburg, Germany. It is a right tributary of the Elbe and runs for approximately 84 kilometers. The Dömnitz is a left tributary of the Stepenitz.

The Stepenitz's source is about five kilometers south of Meyenburg. Along with the Karthane, the Stepenitz flows into the Elbe at Wittenberge.

The Gänsetour ("geese tour") is an approximately 70 km long bicycle route along the Stepenitz. It is named in honor of the family Gans zu Putlitz, one of the oldest noble families of Brandenburg.

Localities on the Stepenitz include:
 Meyenburg
 Marienfließ
 Putlitz
 Wolfshagen
 Perleberg
 Wittenberge

See also
List of rivers of Brandenburg

External links

Rivers of Brandenburg
Rivers of Germany